Miguel Ángel Centeno Báez (born 16 August 1989), is a former Mexican football goalkeeper who played for Liga MX squad Deportivo Toluca.

Club career

Atlético Mexiquense
Centeno started his career in Deportivo Toluca's filial, Atlético Mexiquense.

Deportivo Toluca
On 2009, Centeno was promoted to the first team of Toluca.

Correcaminos UAT
Preview to the Clausura 2017, Centeno was loaned out to Ascenso MX side Correcaminos UAT.

References

1989 births
Living people
Footballers from the State of Mexico
Association football goalkeepers
People from Toluca
Deportivo Toluca F.C. players
Correcaminos UAT footballers
Mexican footballers